Rudskogen Motorsenter is Norway’s oldest asphalt race circuit, opened on May 20, 1990. It has hosted rounds of the TCR Scandinavia Touring Car Championship, Danish Thundersport Championship, Swedish GT Series, NBF GT Championship, GT4 Scandinavia, Danish Super GT, V8 Thunder Cars, Formula STCC Nordic and F4 Danish Championship.

In 2006 the Norwegian government selected Rudskogen Motorsenter as the main national motorsport facility. The venue was rebuilt by Hermann Tilke and re-opened in 2012.

Races for cars and bikes are arranged there in a variety of classes and the track is also hired out privately for corporate events and organisational training, for example for emergency services personnel.

A range of large-scale events have taken place at this track including a round of the European Karting Championship in 2005.

Data from the Norwegian Meteorological Institute shows that the circuit at Rudskogen can be in use for 8 weeks longer per year than other existing race circuits in Norway, because of the southerly location.

Lap records 

Marc Gené held the unofficial lap record with a lap of 1:09.507 with Ferrari F10 in a demonstration event in 2013. The official race lap records at the Rudskogen are listed as:

References

External links 
 Rudskogen Motorsenter

Rakkestad
Motorsport venues in Norway
Racing circuits designed by Hermann Tilke